Ashraf Saber (born 2 April 1973, in Rome) is a former Italian athlete who competed in the 400 metres and 400 metres hurdles, event at which he was world junior champion in 1992.

Biography
He was born to an Egyptian father and an Italian mother (although she was born in Egypt). He won seven medals (five at senior level), at the International athletics competitions, five of these with national relays team.

Achievements

National titles
Ashraf Saber has won 5 times the individual national championship.
1 win in the 400 metres (2000)
4 wins in the 400 metres indoor (1995, 1996, 1998, 2002)

See also
 Italian all-time lists - 400 metres
 Italian all-time lists - 400 metres hurdles
 Italy national relay team

References

External links
 
 Ashraf Saber at RAI website

1973 births
Living people
Italian male hurdlers
Italian male sprinters
Olympic athletes of Italy
Athletes (track and field) at the 1996 Summer Olympics
Athletes from Rome
Italian people of Egyptian descent
Italian sportspeople of African descent
Mediterranean Games bronze medalists for Italy
Athletes (track and field) at the 1997 Mediterranean Games
World Athletics Championships athletes for Italy
Mediterranean Games medalists in athletics
World Athletics Indoor Championships medalists
Italian Athletics Championships winners